The Adar River (or Khor Adar), known to the Dinka as the Yal, is a tributary of the White Nile in the state of Upper Nile, South Sudan.  It flows north west from the Machar Marshes and enters the White Nile just upstream of the town of Melut.

References 

Rivers of South Sudan
Tributaries of the Nile
Upper Nile (state)